Elephant ear sponge may refer to sponges:
 Agelas clathrodes, orange elephant ear sponge
 Agelas flabelliformis, elephant ear sponge
 Ianthella basta, elephant ear sponge
 Stylissa carteri, elephant ear sponge

Animal common name disambiguation pages